This page documents the tornadoes and tornado outbreaks of 1975, primarily in the United States. Most tornadoes form in the U.S., although some events may take place internationally. Tornado statistics for older years like this often appear significantly lower than modern years due to fewer reports or confirmed tornadoes.

Synopsis

Numbers for 1975 were very similar to 1974, in terms of number of tornadoes, but not the number of fatalities; however, there were over 1,100 injuries related to tornadoes.

Events

January
52 tornadoes were reported in the U.S. in January.

January 9–12

Between January 9 and 12, 1975 a panhandle hook cyclone produced tornadoes in the Southeast, including an F4 tornado that hit McComb, Mississippi killing 9 people. It is one of the largest January tornado outbreaks. Aside the tornadoes, the cyclone dumped at least 27" of snow in Riverton, Minnesota. In Willmar, Minnesota, 168 passengers were trapped in a stranded train because they couldn't walk to shelter due to wind chill values.

February
45 tornadoes were reported in the U.S. in February.

February 22–24

A small outbreak of tornadoes impacted the Dixie Alley region, including an F4 tornado that hit Tuscaloosa, Alabama killing 1 person. An F2 tornado hit Altus, Oklahoma, killing 2 people.

March
84 tornadoes were reported in the U.S. in March.

March 28
An F4 Tornado Struck Warren, Arkansas, Killing 7 people.

April
108 tornadoes were reported in the U.S. in April.

April 23–24
Three F4 tornadoes touched down in Missouri, the deadliest being an F4 striking Neosho, Missouri. More tornadoes touched down associated with this outbreak.

May
188 tornadoes were reported in the U.S. in May.

May 6–7

An F4 tornado touched down in Sarpy County, Nebraska, with a path extending to Omaha. Damage estimates ranged from $250 million to $500 million. The number of homes destroyed was 287 with damage to 1400 others. The time of day aided in the warning process as a spotter saw the tornado in Sarpy County during the daylight hours and children were no longer in school. The NWS aided by REACT and Civil Defense systems provided good lead time for the residents of Douglas County, Nebraska. Three people did perish. An elderly woman died in her home and likely did not hear the warnings. A waitress was killed in a restaurant as she huddled with others in the restroom. A man was killed while seeking shelter at a gas station.

June
196 tornadoes were reported in the U.S. in June.

July
79 tornadoes were reported in the U.S. in July.

July 23

A tornado which slashed through a three-block downtown area of the city killed three people. At least 55 others were injured, including 15 who were hospitalized. The twister's winds were so forceful that a 15-foot wooden plank was driven through an auto engine block, splitting the front of the car in two. The twister hit this central Illinois community of 15,000 during the early evening and decimated the business district, severed electrical power and gas lines, and sheared off roofs and uprooted scores of trees. It also overturned numerous automobiles and blew out hundreds of windows. Initial reports from the Illinois State Police placed the number of dead at four, but a spokesman said, "Early confusion probably accounted for duplicated reports." The area hit by the tornado included city square and another block farther south, and also caused extensive damage elsewhere.

August
60 tornadoes were reported in the U.S. in August.

September
34 tornadoes were reported in the U.S in September.

October
12 tornadoes were reported in the U.S. in October.

November
39 tornadoes were reported in the U.S. in November.

November 9–10
A minor two-day tornado outbreak swept across Iowa, Illinois, and Indiana. The strongest tornado of the outbreak, an F3, struck the large city of Waterloo. An F2 tornado injured 4 people when striking the town of Lost Nation, Illinois.

December
22 tornadoes were reported in the U.S. in December.

See also
 Tornado
 Tornadoes by year
 Tornado records
 Tornado climatology
 Tornado myths
 List of tornado outbreaks
 List of F5 and EF5 tornadoes
 List of North American tornadoes and tornado outbreaks
 List of 21st-century Canadian tornadoes and tornado outbreaks
 List of European tornadoes and tornado outbreaks
 List of tornadoes and tornado outbreaks in Asia
 List of Southern Hemisphere tornadoes and tornado outbreaks
 List of tornadoes striking downtown areas
 Tornado intensity
 Fujita scale
 Enhanced Fujita scale

References

 
1975 meteorology
Tornado-related lists by year
Torn